Beijing 2008 is the official Olympic video game of the 2008 Summer Olympics held in Beijing. Developed by Eurocom and published by Sega, the game was the second video game based on the 2008 Summer Olympics to be released, the first being the fantasy-based Mario & Sonic at the Olympic Games which appeared in late 2007; however, Beijing 2008 is a realistic sports simulation.

Beijing 2008 features 32 national teams and 38 events. In addition, a career mode similar to that seen in Sydney 2000 returned, and for the first time in Olympic video games, an online mode is included.

Disciplines
The following events are in the game:

In addition, the game supports competition in the male decathlon or the female heptathlon, 5, 10 or 20 random events, or all of the events. It is possible to take part in all male and female events individually.

Nations represented

 

  Australia
  Austria 
  Bahamas 
  Belgium 
  Brazil
  Canada
  China
  Cuba 
  Denmark 
  Ethiopia 
  Finland
  France 
  Great Britain 
  Germany  
   Greece
  Ireland
  Italy
  Jamaica 
  Japan
  Kenya
  Mexico
  Netherlands
  New Zealand
  Norway
  Poland
  Portugal
  Russia
  South Africa 
  South Korea
  Spain 
  Sweden 
  United States

Reception

Beijing 2008 received "mixed" reviews on all platforms according to the review aggregation website Metacritic. GameSpot said of the game, "rapidly pushing buttons is not fun", and pointed to excessive difficulty. In Japan, Famitsu gave it a score of one three, two fours, and one three for the PlayStation 3 version; and one four, one five, one four, and one three for the Xbox 360 version.

See also
 Olympic video games
 2008 Summer Olympics

References

External links
Beijing 2008 at Eurocom

2008 Summer Olympics
2008 video games
Games for Windows certified games
Video games set in China
Summer Olympic video games
Judo video games
PlayStation 3 games
Sega video games
Video games developed in the United Kingdom
Video games set in 2008
Windows games
Xbox 360 games
Multiplayer and single-player video games
Eurocom games